Altenstadt is a municipality in the district Wetteraukreis, in Hesse, Germany. It is situated in the Nidder valley, approx. 27 kilometers north-east of Frankfurt am Main.

History 
Altenstadt was part of the limes, the former border of the Roman Empire, that passes through the town. According to excavations, Altenstadt was a Roman garrison in the first half of the second century.

The first documented mention of Altenstadt took place only in the year 767, which makes Altenstadt the oldest municipality of Upper Hesse.

Division of the municipality 
The municipality consists of 8 districts:

Notable persons 
One of the inhabitants of Altenstadt was the justice inspector Friedrich Kellner, who alternated his work-week between Laubach and Altenstadt during World War II.  Kellner recorded the misdeeds of the Nazis in a ten-volume diary which was on display in 2005 at the George Bush Presidential Library.  A Canadian documentary, My Opposition: the Diaries of Friedrich Kellner, was produced in 2006.

The Lutheran missionary Georg Heinrich Schwarz was born in Höchst an der Nidder in 1868. He laboured in the Cape Bedford Mission, North Queensland, Australia, for 55 years. The anniversary of his arrival is still celebrated there each year in September and known as Muni Day.

On 5 September 2019, Stefan Jagsch from the extreme-right NPD was elected the Mayor of the Waldsiedlung unopposed, which led to irritation in other parties at national level.

References

External links 
 Official site 
 Website of Lindheim 
 Website of Enzheim 
 Der Weltkrieg war vor deiner Tür Altenstadt and the former Airfield Altenstadt in World War II 

Wetteraukreis